ABC logos may refer to:
Logos of the American Broadcasting Company
Logos of the Australian Broadcasting Corporation